Qamus (القموص) was one of the fortresses of the Jewish poet Al-Rabi ibn Abu al-Huqayq, and his Jewish tribe called Banu Nadir.  The fortress was situated near Khaybar in what is now Saudi Arabia. The fortress was attacked by Muslim forces and defeated circa 629/30 CE. It was after this event that Muhammad married Safiyyah bint Huyayy. The Jewish presence in the region has been attested to the late seventh century who pioneered the cultivation in the area.

It has traditionally been identified with the remains of the Husn al-Qamus (Qamus Fortress) in the old Khaybar oasis, though there's no direct archaeological evidence for this.

See also 

 Battle of Khaybar
 Invasion of Banu Qurayza
 Jewish tribes of Arabia

References

Forts in Saudi Arabia
Banu Qurayza
Jewish Saudi Arabian history
Quranic places
Castles in Saudi Arabia